American Modern Recordings (AMR) is an American classical music record label focusing on contemporary classical music, and in particular, music by living American composers. It was established by Robert Paterson in 2006, and is a subsidiary of Lumiere Records. It is based in New York, New York and is distributed through Naxos of America, a division of Naxos Records.

History
AMR was founded in 2008 with the mission of producing and promoting albums of contemporary classical music by living composers, with an emphasis on American composers. AMR is a subsidiary of Lumiere Records, Inc., a commercial classical label that was founded a few years earlier by Victoria Paterson.

, AMR has released ten albums, including six featuring the American Modern Ensemble, AMR's house band, and many of the albums featuring AMR's founder Robert Paterson, in particular. AMR has also released albums featuring Duo Scorpio, Makoto Nakura, Musica Sacra (New York) and saxophonist Jeremy Justeson. AMR's albums have been released to critical acclaim in newspapers, magazines and online journals and blogs such as The New York Times, Sequenza21, Gramophone and many other publications.

See also
 List of record labels

References

External links
American Modern Recordings (AMR) official site
Naxos Direct AMR Page

Classical music record labels
American independent record labels
Companies based in New York City
Record labels established in 2008
Contemporary classical music
2008 establishments in the United States